Courtney Hodder (born 8 July 2000) is an Australian rules footballer and former rugby union player currently playing for  in the AFL Women's (AFLW). She previously played rugby for the Western Force and the Queensland Reds in the Super W and was the top try-scorer in the competition in 2018.

Early Life
Hodder is of indigenous descent from the Noongar - Yamatji. She grew up in suburban Perth and played junior football with Peel Thunder and was part of 3 under-18 All-Australian teams.

Rugby union
Hodder played for the Western Force in the inaugural season of the Super W in 2018. During a year which included scoring six tries in the Force's round 1 game against the Melbourne Rebels, she finished the season as the top try-scorer in the competition.

She did not play in the 2019 Super W season due to a broken leg, and after recovery was selected near the end of the year to play for Australia A in the Oceania Rugby Women's Championship, where she played two games.

She returned to the Super W in 2020 to play for the Queensland Reds, scoring five tries throughout the shortened season.

Australian rules football
On 28 August 2020,  signed Hodder for the 2021 AFL Women's season as an other-sport rookie. She made her debut that season in round 1 against Richmond, kicking a goal with her first kick.

Statistics
Statistics are correct to the end of the 2021 season. 

|- style="background:#EAEAEA"
| scope="row" text-align:center | 2021
| 
| 21 || 11 || 9 || 8 || 55 || 30 || 85 || 7 || 59 || 0.8 || 0.7 || 5.0 || 2.7 || 7.7 || 0.6 || 5.4 || 0
|- class="sortbottom"
! colspan=3 | Career
! 11
! 9
! 8
! 55
! 30
! 85
! 7
! 59
! 0.8
! 0.7
! 5.0
! 2.7
! 7.7
! 0.6
! 5.4
! 0
|}

Honours and achievements
Individual
 AFL Women's Rising Star nominee: 2021
Goal of the Year Winner 2021

See also

 List of players who have converted from one football code to another

References

External links

2000 births
Living people
Australian female rugby union players
Rugby union fullbacks
Sportswomen from Western Australia
Australian rules footballers from Western Australia
Brisbane Lions (AFLW) players
Indigenous Australian players of Australian rules football
Indigenous Australian rugby union players
21st-century Australian women